Mahkmudkhodja Behbudiy (Cyrillic Маҳмудхўжа Беҳбудий; Arabic script ; born as Mahmudkhodja ibn Behbud Chodscha) (* 20 January 1875 in Samarkand; † 25 March 1919 in Qarshi) was a Jadid activist, writer, journalist and leading public figure in Imperial Russian and Soviet Turkestan.

Life
Mehmudkhodja Behbudiy was born on 20 January 1875 (new calendar) on the outskirts of Samarkand in Russian Turkestan. Many members of his family were Islamic scholars, and Behbudiy too became a Qazi following his madrasah education. After an eight-month trip to Arabia, Transcaucasia, Istanbul and Cairo in 1899, which brought him into contact with the cultural movements in Islam in the wider world, he started his public career in Central Asia in 1903. He subscribed to Ismail Gaspirali's Tercüman and changed his name from ibn Behbud Chodscha to Behbudiy. He also wrote articles in support of Jadidism in all Central Asian newspapers and in 1913 launched Ayina ("The Mirror"), a weekly magazine, which he published almost by himself for twenty months. He also published the newspaper Samarkand. His friends included Siddiqiy Ajziy, Abduqodir Shakuriy and Haji Muin.

After the February Revolution in 1917, Behbudiy became one of the two Muslim members of the first executive committee in Samarkand. During the debate on territorial autonomy for Turkestan in the following months, Behbudiy was one of the few Jadids to argue in favor.

Behbudiy was arrested by the last Emir of Bukhara in Qarshi in 1919, probably while on his way to the Paris Peace Conference. After a period of torture, in which he also wrote his last will, he was executed. Qarshi was later renamed in his honor from 1922 to 1937.

Work

Behbudiy's work is divided into two phases by the Russian Revolution of 1917. Before it, Behbudiy wrote newspaper and magazine articles as well as textbooks, his first publication being an article in Turkiston viloyatining gazeti. He also established a reading room in Samarkand and promoted theatre, which he saw as an effective way to spread propaganda. In 1913, he also wrote the first modern Central Asian play with Padarkush ("The Patricide"), which was seen as a native counterweight against Tatar guest plays. Typical for modernist writing in Central Asia, many of his works had a strong educational message. After the revolution, he became directly involved in politics, attending congresses and giving speeches to Soviet government representatives.

One of his concerns was equal education opportunities for all citizens; he also fought for the rights of women and wanted both genders to be equal.

Works (selection)
During his lifetime, Behbudiy made important contributions to Uzbek literature. By the time of his death, he had written more than 200 articles, textbooks and theatre plays for various magazines and newspapers, including Tercüman and Vaqt.

 1903: Muntaxabi jug'rofiyai umumiy (Textbook for Geography)
 1904: Kitob-ul-atfol (Children's book)
 1904: Muxtasari tarixi islom ("A Brief History of Islam")
 1908: Russiyaning qisqacha jug'rofiyasi ("The Geography of Russia")
 1913: Padarkush ("The Patricide")

References

Literature
 Adeeb Khalid: The Politics of Muslim Cultural Reform: Jadidism in Central Asia, Berkeley & Los Angeles 1998.
 Ahmad Aliyev: Madhmudkho'ja Behbudiy, Tashkent 1994.
 D. Alimova, D. Rashidova: Mahmod Khoja Behbudiy and his Historical Vision, Tashkent 1998.
 Charles Kurzman: Modernist Islam, 1840–1940. A Sourcebook, New York 2002, p. 257.

1875 births
1919 deaths
Islam in Russia
Jadids
Behbudiy
Behbudiy
Behbudiy
Behbudiy
Behbudiy
Behbudiy
Behbudiy
Behbudiy